Lake Loon is a suburban and rural community of the Halifax Regional Municipality in the Canadian province of Nova Scotia. It is named after a nearby lake. The community was created by the Halifax Regional Municipality by the Civic Address office  in April 2011 taking a portion of the nearby community of Westphal.

References
Explore HRM
Loon Lake

Communities in Halifax, Nova Scotia
General Service Areas in Nova Scotia